Ward 1 is a ward of Vũng Tàu in Bà Rịa–Vũng Tàu province, Vietnam, forming the historical centre of the city. 
The iconic Front Beach and Front Beach parklands as well as the former Vung Tau Market are located in this ward.

References

Communes of Bà Rịa-Vũng Tàu province
Populated places in Bà Rịa-Vũng Tàu province